The Gettysburg Area School District is a mid-sized, rural, public school district which serves students in a  area of Adams County, Pennsylvania. The district includes: Gettysburg Borough, as well as Cumberland, Freedom, Highland, Franklin and parts of Mt. Joy and Straban Townships. According to 2000 federal census data, Gettysburg Area School District served a resident population of 26,205 people. By 2010, the district's population increased to 27,614 people. The educational attainment levels for the Gettysburg Area School District population (25 years old and over) were 87.4% high school graduates and 27.4% college graduates. The district is one of the 500 public school districts of Pennsylvania.

According to the Pennsylvania Budget and Policy Center, 42.3% of the district's pupils lived at 185% or below the Federal Poverty Level   as shown by their eligibility for the federal free or reduced price school meal programs in 2012. In 2013, the Pennsylvania Department of Education, reported that 130 students in Gettysburg Area School District were homeless. In 2009, the district residents' per capita income was $18,982, while median family income was $50,396 a year. In the Commonwealth, the median family income was $49,501 and the United States median family income was $49,445, in 2010. In Adams County, the median household income was $59,492. By 2013, the median household income in the United States rose to $52,100. In 2014, the median household income in the USA was $53,700.

The district operates three elementary schools Franklin Township Elementary School - K-5,  James Gettys Elementary School - K-5, Lincoln Elementary School - K-5, one middle school (grades 6–8) and Gettysburg Area High School (grades 9–12.) Since 2010, the district has also offered a Virtual Academy program to pupils in grades 7th through 12th. There is no cost to the parent for the program; with: computer, software, books are all provided by the district. The pupils have access to all extracurricular programs in the district and can earn a Gettysburg Area School District diploma.

Lincoln Intermediate Unit #12 provides a wide variety of services to children living in its region which includes Gettysburg Area School District. Early screening, special educations services, speech and hearing therapy, Head Start preschool classes and many other services are available. Services for children during the preschool years are provided without cost to their families when the child is determined to meet eligibility requirements.

Schools

In June 2011, the school board voted to close Eisenhower Elementary School. The school had opened in the 1959–60 school year. Closing the school was projected to save $500,000. The building was leased to two public charter schools: Vida Charter School and Gettysburg Montessori Charter School beginning with the 2011–12 school year.  The lease provides the district with over $150,000 in rent.

Extracurriculars
The Gettysburgh Area School District offers a variety of clubs, activities and an extensive sports program. The district funds:

Sports
Varsity

Boys
Baseball - AAA
Basketball- AAA
Cross Country - AA
Football - AAA
Golf - AAA
Soccer - AA
Swimming and Diving - AA
Tennis - AAA
Track and Field - AAA
Wrestling	- AAA

Girls
Basketball - AAA
Cheer - AAAA
Cross Country - AAA
Field Hockey - AAA
Golf - AAA
Soccer (Fall) - AAA
Softball - AAA
Swimming and Diving - AAA
Girls' Tennis - AAA
Track and Field - AAA
Volleyball - AAA

Middle School Sports

Boys
Basketball
Football
Soccer
Track and Field
Wrestling	

Girls
Basketball
Field Hockey
Softball (Fall)
Track and Field
Volleyball

According to PIAA directory July 2013

References

External links
District Website

School districts in Adams County, Pennsylvania
School districts established in 1971